Feniosky Peña-Mora (born March 6, 1966) is a Dominican-born engineer, educator, and former commissioner of the New York City Department of Design and Construction. He also served as the 14th Dean of Columbia University's Fu Foundation School of Engineering and Applied Science and as the Associate Provost of the University of Illinois at Urbana–Champaign.

Career

Higher education
Peña-Mora is the Edwin Howard Armstrong Professor of Civil Engineering and Engineering Mechanics at Columbia University. Previously, he was also the dean of the Columbia School of Engineering and Applied Science at the university.

As dean, he focused on implementing a three-pronged strategic plan encompassing faculty excellence, student support, and space growth. During his deanship, the School of Engineering and Applied Science doubled its endowed chairs and raised $75 million for Columbia Engineering. Peña-Mora also led the reformulation of the online Master's program in engineering, which ranked number 1 in the 2013 U.S. News & World Report.

Peña-Mora's tenure was controversial. A number of faculty members and department chairmen passed a "no-confidence" vote in his leadership. They criticized his self-serving style of management, his hasty expansion of the engineering school, which overloaded professors with too many students, and asserted that he prioritized fund-raising over research and did not honor his promises. One of Peña-Mora's most vocal critics, Van C. Mow, called him a "control freak" and stepped down from his position as Chair of the Department of Biomedical Engineering in 2011. Mow's harsh critique was challenged by some as being driven by his general "resistance to change," especially when implemented by a dean 26 years his junior. After various attempts to bridge the differences, Peña-Mora eventually resigned in July 2012.

Peña-Mora resigned from his position as Dean in July 2012. As a results, some questioned their “confidence—as well as the confidence of many others at Columbia—in the ability of Columbia to maintain diverse leadership at the top.” Faculty, students and community leaders complained about “racial bias in its ranks“. A highly regarded Hispanic biology professor has complained to Columbia President Lee Bollinger about the "ethnic bullying", "unbridled racism" and "the shameful bullying of our engineering Dean Peña-Mora shows similar characteristics" to the ‘gauntlet’ other minority faculty have faced at Columbia.” Another professor communicated how senior faculty in engineering even “complain about his [Peña-Mora] Spanish accent"; which was especially surprising, given that Israel-born Zvi Galil, Dean of the Engineering School from 1995–2007, had a strong accent that was "loved" by many.

Peña-Mora continues to supervise PhD and graduate research students and was listed as being on "public service leave" while serving at the DDC. He maintains a named professorship with a salary of more than $500,000 in 2015 on top of his salary as Commissioner.

Public service
On April 8, 2014, Dr. Peña-Mora was appointed the Commissioner of the New York City Department of Design and Construction (DDC) by Mayor Bill de Blasio. While Commissioner, Peña-Mora visited many of the DDC's projects, including the rehabilitation of the High Bridge, which restored a vital link between upper Manhattan and the Bronx; the new New York City Police Academy in College Point, Queens, which will train more than 1,600 new police officers each year to protect the City; the Ocean Breeze Athletic Center, which symbolizes continued investment in neighborhoods impacted by Hurricane Sandy; and, the transformation of Times Square into a permanent pedestrian plaza.

Controversy followed Peña-Mora to the public sector in 2016 when a supposed quid pro quo scheme was uncovered, as Peña-Mora directed DDC funds and City contracts to Renee Sacks, and organizations she works with, and Sacks' firm, Sacks Communications, made its entire Spring 2016 issue of Diversity/Agenda magazine all about Peña-Mora.

On June 21, 2017, Peña-Mora announced his plans to step down from the DDC. News reports tied his departure to "Hurricane Sandy rebuilding failures."

Patents
 Hussein, K. and Peña-Mora, F., “Collaborative Agent Interaction Control and Synchronization System,” MIT Case No. 8376S, Daly, Crowley & Mofford, LLP file MIT-057AUS, US Patent Application No. 09/540,947, Issued February 28, 2006. 
 Peña-Mora, F. and Kuang, C., “Mechanisms and Artifacts to Manage Heterogeneous Platform Interfaces in a Collaboration,” MIT Case No. 9249S Daly, Crowley & Mofford, LLP file MIT-057BUS, US Patent Application No. 10/069,885, Issued January 9, 2007.
 Peña-Mora, F., Vadhavkar, S., Dwivedi, G., Kuang, C., and Wang, W., “Software Service Handoff Mechanism with A Performance Reliability Improvement Mechanism (PRIM) for a Collaborative Client-Server System,” MIT Case No. 9250S, Daly, Crowley & Mofford, LLP file MIT-092AUS, US Patent Application No. 10/069,797, Issued May 15, 2007.
 Peña-Mora, F., Park, M., Lee, S., Fulenwider, M., and Li, M. “Dynamic Planning Method and System,” MIT Case No. 9185S, Daly, Crowley & Mofford, LLP file MIT-086AUS, US Patent Application No. 10/068,119, US Patent No. 7,349,863, Issued March 25, 2008.
 Peña-Mora, F., Park, M., Lee, S., Fulenwider, M., and Li, M. “Reliability Buffering Technique Applied to a Project Planning Model,” MIT Case No. 9186S, Daly, Crowley & Mofford, LLP file MIT-087PUSP, US Patent No. 7,415,393, Issued August 19, 2008. 
 Golparvar-Fard M., Peña-Mora, F., and Savarese, S. (2010). “D4AR- 4 Dimensional Augmented Reality Models for Automation and Visualization of Construction Progress Monitoring.” United States Provisional Patent Application No. 61/570,491, filed December 14, 2011. 
 Thomas J., Peña-Mora, F., and Golparvar-Fard, M. (2009). “Mobile Workstation Chariot.” Provisional Patent, U.S. Patent and Trademark Office (Docket Number: TF08208-PRO).

References

External links
New Dean is Feniosky Pena-Mora
Curriculum Vitae
New York Times: An Immigrant’s Journey to a Top Post at Columbia
Columbia Spectator: Who runs Columbia: Find out who is large and in charge
Research Group

People from Washington Heights, Manhattan
Teachers College, Columbia University alumni
Massachusetts Institute of Technology alumni
Columbia School of Engineering and Applied Science faculty
Living people
1966 births
Dominican Republic scientists
Dominican Republic engineers
Bronx Community College alumni